Buttonia is a genus of flowering plants belonging to the family Orobanchaceae.

Its native range is Kenya to Southern Africa.

Species:

Buttonia natalensis 
Buttonia superba

References

Orobanchaceae
Orobanchaceae genera